Olga Kuzyukova (born September 27, 1985) is a Russian cross-country skier.  She competed at the 2014 Winter Olympics in Sochi, in skiathlon and women's classical.

Cross-country skiing results
All results are sourced from the International Ski Federation (FIS).

Olympic Games

World Championships

World Cup

Season standings

References

External links

1985 births
Living people
Cross-country skiers at the 2014 Winter Olympics
Olympic cross-country skiers of Russia
Russian female cross-country skiers
Tour de Ski skiers
People from Rubtsovsk
Sportspeople from Altai Krai